The ABA League Supercup, also credited as ABA Super Cup, is an annual men's professional basketball supercup competition between teams from the ABA League. It is run by the ABA League JTD. It is a regional competition, that is contested between teams from six countries: Bosnia and Herzegovina, Croatia, Macedonia, Montenegro, Serbia and Slovenia.

History 
The ABA League Assembly, held on July 24, 2017, in Belgrade, Serbia, decided to organize the ABA League Supercup, with 8 participants.

In 2017, the first edition of the ABA Super Cup took place in Bar, Montenegro, where Cedevita became champions. In the second season, the teams met in Laktaši, where Crvena zvezda became champions. The third ABA Super Cup took place in Zagreb in 2019 and was won by Partizan.

Teams from Bosnia and Herzegovina, Croatia, Republic of Macedonia, Montenegro, Serbia, and Slovenia previously played in a similar competition, when they were part of SFR Yugoslavia. The Yugoslav Basketball Cup was played for 33 years, from 1959 to 1992 (not held in 1961, 1963–68). In 1992, the Serbian club Partizan, was the last winner of that competition, while the Croatian club Cibona, won the most titles in that competition.

On 29 June 2020, the ABA League Assembly canceled the 2020 tournament due to the COVID-19 pandemic. The 2020 tournament would have been played on 20–23 September 2020 in Podgorica, Montenegro.

Title holders 
 2017  Cedevita
 2018  Crvena zvezda mts
 2019  Partizan NIS

Finals

All-time participants 
The following is a list of clubs that have played in the Adriatic Supercup, at any time, since its formation in 2017, to the current season.

Key

List of participants

Awards

MVPs

See also 
 Yugoslav Basketball Cup
 Alpe Adria Cup

References

External links
 

2017 establishments in Europe
ABA League
Basketball competitions in Bosnia and Herzegovina
Basketball competitions in Croatia
Basketball competitions in North Macedonia
Basketball competitions in Montenegro
Basketball cup competitions in Serbia
Basketball competitions in Slovenia
Basketball supercup competitions in Europe
Recurring sporting events established in 2017